Dominic Obukadata Oneya (26 May 1948 – 4 August 2021) was Administrator of Kano State, Nigeria from August 1996 to August 1998 during the military regime of General Sani Abacha, then Administrator of Benue State from August 1998 to May 1999 during the transitional regime of General Abdulsalami Abubakar, handing over power to the elected executive governor George Akume on 29 May 1999.
Later, he became Chairman of the Nigeria Football Association.

Birth and education
Dominic Obukadata Oneya was born 26 May 1948 in Apapa, Local Government Area, Lagos State. 
His family is Urhobo.
His origins are in Agbarho, Ughelli North Local Government Area, Delta State.
He attended the Baptist Academy, Yaba, Lagos (1962–1967), then enlisted in the Nigerian Defence Academy in May 1969, earning a commission in the 
Infantry Corps in September 1971. Oneya attended the University of Ife, Ile-Ife (now Obafemi Awolowo University) (1977–1980), earning B.Sc. degree in physical education. He attended the Command and Staff College, Jaji, Kaduna (1983–1984) and the Canadian Land Force Command and Staff College, Kingston, Ontario, Canada (1987–1988).

Military career

Command positions during his military career include 
Adjutant of 31 Infantry Battalion (1971–1972),  
Instructor at 4 Division Training School (1972–1973) and 
Instructor at Nigerian Army Military Training College, Jaji (1975–1977). 
As a Staff Officer from 1977 he served at Army Headquarters Lagos and in operations with the United Nations Interim Force in Lebanon (1980–1981). 
He was Commandant of the Nigerian Army Physical Training School, Zaria (1985–1987), 
Directing Staff, Command and Staff College, Jaji (1987–1989) and 
Directing Staff, Ghana Armed Forces College Teshe, Ghana (1989–1991). 
He was appointed Commander, 82 Motorized Infantry Brigade, Kano (1993–1995),  
Commander, 16 Battalion, Nigerian ECOMOG Contingent in Liberia and then 
Director of administration, Training and Doctrine Command (1995-July 1996).

On 22 August 1996, General Sani Abacha appointed him Administrator of Kano State, Nigeria. In August 1998, he traded places with Aminu Isa Kontagora to become Administrator of Benue State during the transitional regime of General Abdulsalami Abubakar, handing over to the elected executive governor George Akume on 29 May 1999.
Akume had served as Permanent Secretary for Brigadier General Dominic Oneya. 
While governor of Benue State he initiated a project to build a major fertilizer plant, with the government paying about N70 million for preliminary work. However, there were delays and setbacks, and the project was only completed in February 2007.

Later career

On 17 January 2000, Oneya was appointed Chairman of the Nigeria Football Association.
In February 2002, talking of a decision to replace Amodu Shaibu by Festus Onigbinde as manager, he said Nigeria should have gained more than a bronze medal at the African Nations Cup, given the wealth of talent among Nigerian footballers. He was looking forward to stronger performances at the upcoming World Cup, the 2004 Olympics and the 2003 All-Africa Games which would be hosted by Nigeria.

In July 2008, Oneya headed a team charged by the National Sports Commission with investigating allegations of corruption in the local league, in response to comments from former Kano Pillars coach Kadiri Ikhana.
Speaking on Lagos radio in December 2009, Oneya appealed to Nigerians to give Super Eagles Head Coach, Shuaibu Amodu, a free rein to do his job.

See also
List of governors of Benue State

References

Nigerian generals
1948 births
2021 deaths
Governors of Kano State
Governors of Benue State
Baptist Academy alumni
Nigerian Defence Academy alumni
Obafemi Awolowo University alumni
Nigeria Football Federation
People from Lagos State